Calathus focarilei is a species of ground beetle from the Platyninae subfamily that is endemic to Italy.

References

focarilei
Beetles described in 1947
Endemic fauna of Italy
Beetles of Europe